Kevyn Manuel Montaño Gasca (born April 6, 1995, in Nezahualcóyotl) is a Mexican professional  footballer who plays as a midfielder. He made his professional debut for Cruz Azul during a Copa MX victory over Pachuca on 15 September 2015.

References

External links
 
 

Living people
1995 births
Association football midfielders
Cruz Azul footballers
Cruz Azul Hidalgo footballers
Liga MX players
Liga Premier de México players
Footballers from the State of Mexico
People from Nezahualcóyotl
Mexican footballers